Suspect Zero is a 2004 psychological thriller film directed by E. Elias Merhige and starring Aaron Eckhart, Ben Kingsley, and Carrie-Anne Moss. The film was produced by Tom Cruise's co-owned company Cruise/Wagner Productions. It was a box office bomb failing to earn half of its estimated $27 million production costs at the box office.

The film is about the hunt for Suspect Zero, a potential serial killer who is able to kill indefinitely because he is able to remain undetectable by law enforcement agencies. It features various elements from declassified DIA Stargate remote viewing protocols.

Plot

Traveling salesman Harold Speck is approached by a man in a diner who asks him an uncomfortable question. After leaving the diner, Harold is found dead with his eyelids cut off and clutching a symbol consisting of a circle with a line through it. The murder is investigated by FBI Agent Thomas Mackelway (Aaron Eckhart), who was recently suspended for beating suspected serial killer Raymond Starkey. Mackelway receives a series of taunting faxes from someone who may be Speck's killer. As the investigation proceeds, Mackelway and his partner, Fran Kulok (Carrie-Anne Moss), become aware of the possible existence of Suspect Zero, a "super serial killer" responsible for hundreds of deaths who leaves no evidence behind to link his crimes together.

Another body is found in the trunk of a car bearing an M.O. similar to Speck's murder. The ownership of the car is traced to a room in a halfway house occupied by Benjamin O'Ryan. The agents discover that the room is filled with obsessive-compulsive sketches of the crossed-circle symbol, a Bible which contains sketches of missing persons, and a book on ritual. Questioning the other occupants of the halfway house, Mackelway is told by one of them the symbol represents a zero, not a circle. Information sent by the killer leads Mackelway to O'Ryan (Ben Kingsley), who believes himself to be a former member of the FBI. The agents must decide if O'Ryan is the key to catching Suspect Zero, or if he is Suspect Zero himself.

Outside a bar, O'Ryan kills a man who attempts to kidnap and rape a young girl. When Mackelway and Kulok arrive, they find that the body belongs to Starkey, who had been released from prison. Evidence reveals that O'Ryan was part of Project Icarus, a secret government project attempting to cultivate telepathic abilities in individuals for military purposes. The experiments gave O'Ryan the ability to see the actions of serial killers, driving him to hunt them down. O'Ryan demonstrates that Mackelway shares his abilities to some degree. Neither Kulok nor Mackelway's superiors are convinced by his theories that O'Ryan is chasing the killer rather than being the killer.

Suspect Zero is revealed to be a man who drives cross-country in a refrigerated truck. He targets children, whom he abducts and transports to his ranch, where he kills them. Mackelway links these crimes by recognizing that victims had signs of freezer burns while being transported. Mackelway chases one truck driver to a carnival, only to find that the child he saw in his vision as "captured" is free. O'Ryan suddenly appears and captures Mackelway. After refusing to be frightened, O'Ryan spares Mackelway. Eventually, the two men track Suspect Zero to his ranch and find numerous shallow graves. Chasing him, both vehicles crash off the road. Kulok manages to free a child while Mackelway kills Suspect Zero. O'Ryan then tries to convince Mackelway to end his suffering by killing him. When Mackelway refuses, O'Ryan pretends to attack him, prompting Kulok to shoot him to defend her partner.

Cast
Aaron Eckhart – Thomas Mackelway
Ben Kingsley – Benjamin O'Ryan
Carrie-Anne Moss – Fran Kulok
Kevin Chamberlin – Harold Speck
Harry J. Lennix – Rich Charleton

Production

Screenplay
The film is based on a first draft by Zak Penn, which allegedly impressed Steven Spielberg so much in its depiction of serial killers' elongated middle fingers that he went home and checked his children's hands. After it was sold to Universal Studios for $750,000, Cruise/Wagner Productions became attached to the film, with Tom Cruise and Paula Wagner producing. However the script was put onto the back burner after a deal to make the movie in 1997 with Sylvester Stallone fell through. Cruise had intended to star in the film initially, but instead opted to star in Eyes Wide Shut. Universal then courted Ben Affleck to rewrite Penn's script, but Affleck would depart the project over creative differences in November 1999. Christian Duguay would sign on to direct the film, while Paul Schrader and Richard Friedenberg were brought in for subsequent script revisions. By August 2001, E. Elias Merhige replaced Duguay as director, with production gearing up to start in fall of that year.

In 2002, Cruise/Wagner Productions hired Bill Ray to rewrite Penn's original script. Changes included moving the action from Texas, making the lead character a burned-out, disgraced FBI agent rather than a rookie, and turning a maverick criminal profiler into a psychic with the power of remote viewing.

Filming
The film began shooting in Albuquerque, New Mexico in 2002. The state was chosen because it offered tax-free incentives and financial funding to film companies using New Mexico. The program was established to entice film makers to the state.

Reception

On review aggregator Rotten Tomatoes, Suspect Zero holds an approval rating of 18% with a rating average of 4.4/10 based on 129 reviews. Its consensus reads, "Other than Ben Kingsley, there's not much to like in this preposterous thriller." On Metacritic, the film has a weighted average score of 37 out of 100, based on 29 critics, indicating "Generally unfavorable reviews".

Roger Ebert felt that the film was too confusing, stating "enigmatic flashes of incomprehensible action grow annoying, and a point at which we realize that there's no use paying close attention, because we won't be able to figure out the film's secrets until they're explained to us." Nick Schager from Slant Magazine wrote a particularly scathing review of the film, stating "Suspect Zero proves, uninspired imitation is the lowest form of thriller filmmaking." Carla Meyer from the San Francisco Chronicle was also critical of the film, writing, "Suspect Zero needed to be exceptional, and it isn't. It's merely adequate, with one riveting element but limited chills."

Home media
Suspect Zero was released via DVD on April 12, 2005, and was re-released via DVD on August 1, 2017 by Paramount Home Entertainment

References

External links
 
 
 
 
 
 Cast/Crew listing by the New York Times
 New York Times Review by Manohla Dargis
 "Anatomy of a Murder: the Unmaking of Suspect Zero, or How to Kill a Movie in a Hollywood Minute" back-story commentary

2004 films
2000s English-language films
Paramount Pictures films
Columbia Pictures films
American psychological thriller films
2004 psychological thriller films
American police detective films
Films shot in New Mexico
American vigilante films
Paranormal films
Cruise/Wagner Productions films
Lakeshore Entertainment films
Films with screenplays by Zak Penn
Films directed by E. Elias Merhige
Films scored by Clint Mansell
Films with screenplays by Billy Ray
Films produced by Tom Rosenberg
Films produced by Gary Lucchesi
2000s American films